Melangguane Airport, also known as Melonguane Airport  is an airport serving the city of Melangguane, located within the Talaud Islands Regency, part of the province of North Sulawesi on the island of Karakelong in Indonesia.

Airlines and destinations

Facilities 

References 

Airports in North Sulawesi